Affine differential geometry is a type of differential geometry which studies invariants of volume-preserving affine transformations. The name affine differential geometry follows from Klein's Erlangen program. The basic difference between affine and Riemannian differential geometry is that affine differential geometry studies manifolds equipped with a volume form rather than a metric.

Preliminaries
Here we consider the simplest case, i.e. manifolds of codimension one. Let  be an n-dimensional manifold, and let ξ be a vector field on  transverse to  such that  for all  where ⊕ denotes the direct sum and Span the linear span.

For a smooth manifold, say N, let Ψ(N) denote the module of smooth vector fields over N. Let  be the standard covariant derivative on Rn+1 where 
We can decompose DXY into a component tangent to M and a transverse component, parallel to ξ. Notice that ∇ and h depend upon the choice of transverse vector field ξ. We consider only those hypersurfaces for which h is non-degenerate. This is a property of the hypersurface M and does not depend upon the choice of transverse vector field ξ. If h is non-degenerate then we say that M is non-degenerate. In the case of curves in the plane, the non-degenerate curves are those without inflexions. In the case of surfaces in 3-space, the non-degenerate surfaces are those without parabolic points.

We may also consider the derivative of ξ in some tangent direction, say X. This quantity, DXξ, can be decomposed into a component tangent to M and a transverse component, parallel to ξ. This gives the Weingarten equation:  The type-(1,1)-tensor  is called the affine shape operator, the differential one-form  is called the transverse connexion form. Again, both S and τ depend upon the choice of transverse vector field ξ.

The first induced volume form

Let  be a volume form defined on Rn+1. We can induce a volume form on M given by  given by  This is a natural definition: in Euclidean differential geometry where ξ is the Euclidean unit normal then the standard Euclidean volume spanned by X1,...,Xn is always equal to ω(X1,...,Xn). Notice that ω depends on the choice of transverse vector field ξ.

The second induced volume form

For tangent vectors X1,...,Xn let  be the  given by  We define a second volume form on M given by  where  Again, this is a natural definition to make. If M = Rn and h is the Euclidean scalar product then ν(X1,...,Xn) is always the standard Euclidean volume spanned by the vectors X1,...,Xn.
Since h depends on the choice of transverse vector field ξ it follows that ν does too.

Two natural conditions

We impose two natural conditions. The first is that the induced connexion ∇ and the induced volume form ω be compatible, i.e. ∇ω ≡ 0. This means that  for all  In other words, if we parallel transport the vectors X1,...,Xn along some curve in M, with respect to the connexion ∇, then the volume spanned by X1,...,Xn, with respect to the volume form ω, does not change. A direct calculation shows that  and so  for all  if, and only if, τ ≡ 0, i.e.  for all  This means that the derivative of ξ, in a tangent direction X, with respect to D always yields a, possibly zero, tangent vector to M. The second condition is that the two volume forms ω and ν coincide, i.e.

The conclusion

These two special transverse vector fields are called affine normal vector fields, or sometimes called Blaschke normal fields. From its dependence on volume forms for its definition we see that the affine normal vector field is invariant under volume preserving affine transformations. These transformations are given by  where SL(n+1,R) denotes the special linear group of  matrices with real entries and determinant 1, and ⋉ denotes the semi-direct product.  forms a Lie group.

The affine normal line

The affine normal line at a point  is the line passing through p and parallel to ξ.

Plane curves

The affine normal vector field for a curve in the plane has a nice geometrical interpretation. Let  be an open interval and let  be a smooth parametrisation of a plane curve. We assume that γ(I) is a non-degenerate curve (in the sense of Nomizu and Sasaki), i.e. is without inflexion points. Consider a point  on the plane curve.

Consider the tangent line to γ(I) at γ(t0), and consider near-by parallel lines on the side of the tangent line containing the piece of curve  For parallel lines sufficiently close to the tangent line they will intersect P in exactly two points. On each parallel line we mark the midpoint of the line segment joining these two intersection points. For each parallel line we get a midpoint, and so the locus of midpoints traces out a curve starting at p. The limiting tangent line to the locus of midpoints as we approach p is exactly the affine normal line, i.e. the line containing the affine normal vector to γ(I) at γ(t0). Notice that this is an affine invariant construction since parallelism and midpoints are invariant under affine transformations.

Consider the parabola given by the parametrisation .

Surfaces in 3-space

A similar analogue exists for finding the affine normal line at elliptic points of smooth surfaces in 3-space. This time one takes planes parallel to the tangent plane. These, for planes sufficiently close to the tangent plane, intersect the surface to make convex plane curves. Each convex plane curve has a centre of mass. The locus of centres of mass trace out a curve in 3-space. The limiting tangent line to this locus as one tends to the original surface point is the affine normal line, i.e. the line containing the affine normal vector.

See also 
 Affine geometry of curves
 Affine focal set
 Affine sphere

References

Differential geometry